This is a list of museums that include submarines that can either be toured or viewed on display.

Australia

Brazil 
  – Navy Cultural Centre in Rio de Janeiro – Oberon-class, Launched in 1975, decommissioned 1997.

Canada

Chile 
 SS-22 O'Brien – Oberon class – sold to Municipality in Valdivia, Chile; in October 2008, and currently open for guided visits.

Croatia 
 CB-20 – On display at Technical museum in Zagreb, Croatia

Denmark

Estonia 
  – Estonian Maritime Museum, Tallinn, Estonia – one of two Kalev class mine-laying submarines built for the Republic of Estonia. Launched 1936.

Finland 
  – Suomenlinna, Helsinki. Launched 1933.

France

Germany

India 
  – Ramakrishna Mission Beach, Visakhapatnam, Andhra Pradesh. Service: 1969–2001.

Indonesia 
 KRI Pasopati (410) – Indonesian Navy Submarine Monument, Surabaya, East Java, Indonesia – Early Cold War Soviet Whiskey-class submarine. Launched 1952.

Israel

Italy

Japan 
  – JMSDF Kure Museum, Kure, Japan – Yushio-class sub. Launched 1985.
 HA-18 – Japanese Type 'A' Midget Submarine, used at Pearl Harbor, TH, 7 December 1941. Now at The Naval History Museum, Etajima, Japan.

Malaysia 

 FS Ouessant (S623) Agosta-class submarine – Submarine Museum in Klebang, Malaysia

Netherlands 
 HNLMS Tonijn (S-805) – Dutch Naval Museum, Den Helder, The Netherlands  – Potvis-class sub. Launched 1965.

Norway 

 HNoMS Utstein (S-203) – Norwegian Naval Museum, Horten, Norway  – Kobben-class sub. (207 class in Germany) Launched 1965.

Pakistan 
  – Pakistan Maritime Museum, Karachi, Pakistan – Daphné class submarine (French built) that served in the Pakistan Navy from 1970 to 2006. She was the first (and one of only two) submarine after World War II which sank enemy warship – Indian Navy's anti-submarine frigate INS Khukri, in the 1971 Indo-Pakistani War.

Peru 
 BAP Abtao – Peruvian Naval Museum, Callao, Peru – BAP Abtao (SS-42) Abtao-class submarine of the Peruvian Navy. Launched in 1954.

Russian Federation

Slovenia 
 P-913 ZETA – the Pivka Military History Park, Pivka, Slovenija – Una type midget submarine. Launched 1987.

South Africa
 in Simon's Town, South Africa.

South Korea 
 Sang-O class submarine – 1996 Gangneung submarine infiltration incident – located at Gangneung Unification Park.

Spain

Sweden

Switzerland

Turkey

United Kingdom

United States

See also
 List of museum ships
 United States Submarine Veterans Inc. (USSVI)

References

External links
 Submarine museum of the world, map 
 Historical Naval Ships Association
 The Rahmi M Koç Museum
 U. S. Navy Submarine Force Museum
 Patterson Museum
 WWII U.S. Submarine Memorials and Museums
 Museum submarines in the United States
 Indonesian Navy Submarine Monument
 CB-20 midget submarine page
 1996 North Korean Gangneung submarine infiltration incident museum pictures and information
 Picture and location of HA-51
 Melaka Bandaraya Warisan Dunia Museum Submarine Melaka

Museum
Lists of museums by subject
Submarine museums